Stage School is a British structured reality television series, set at the D&B Academy of Performing Arts, a drama school in Bromley, London. The series follows the lives of staff and students who are trying to make their dreams a reality. It began broadcasting on E4 on 5 September 2016, and was described as a cross between The Only Way is Essex meets Glee meets High School Musical. The second and final series was broadcast from 25 September 2017 to 3 November 2017.

Cast members

External links 

Channel 4

2016 British television series debuts
2017 British television series endings
2010s British reality television series
2010s college television series
British college television series
E4 reality television shows
English-language television shows
London Borough of Bromley
Television shows set in London
Works about performing arts education